Liberal Party leadership election  may refer to:

Australia
 1989 Liberal Party of Australia leadership spill
 1990 Liberal Party of Australia leadership election
 1994 Liberal Party of Australia leadership spill
 1995 Liberal Party of Australia leadership spill
 2007 Liberal Party of Australia leadership election
 2008 Liberal Party of Australia leadership spill
 2009 Liberal Party of Australia leadership spill
 February 2015 Liberal Party of Australia leadership spill motion
 September 2015 Liberal Party of Australia leadership spill
 2018 Liberal Party of Australia leadership spills
 2022 Liberal Party of Australia leadership election

Northern Territory
 2013 Country Liberal Party leadership spill
 2015 Country Liberal Party leadership spill

Canada
Liberal Party of Canada

 1919 Liberal Party of Canada leadership election
 1948 Liberal Party of Canada leadership election
 1958 Liberal Party of Canada leadership election
 1968 Liberal Party of Canada leadership election
 1980 Liberal Party of Canada leadership election
 1984 Liberal Party of Canada leadership election
 1990 Liberal Party of Canada leadership election
 2003 Liberal Party of Canada leadership election
 2006 Liberal Party of Canada leadership election
 2009 Liberal Party of Canada leadership election
 2013 Liberal Party of Canada leadership election
Liberal Party of Canada Branches
 Alberta Liberal Party leadership elections
 British Columbia Liberal Party leadership elections
 Manitoba Liberal Party leadership elections
 New Brunswick Liberal Association leadership elections
 Nova Scotia Liberal Party leadership elections
 Ontario Liberal Party leadership elections
 Prince Edward Island Liberal Party leadership elections
 Quebec Liberal Party leadership elections
 Saskatchewan Liberal Party leadership elections
Liberal Party of Newfoundland and Labrador
 Liberal Party of Newfoundland and Labrador leadership elections

New Zealand
 1889 New Zealand Liberal Party leadership election
 1893 New Zealand Liberal Party leadership election
 1906 New Zealand Liberal Party leadership election
 1912 New Zealand Liberal Party leadership election
 1913 New Zealand Liberal Party leadership election
 1919 New Zealand Liberal Party leadership election
 1920 New Zealand Liberal Party leadership election
 1925 New Zealand Liberal Party leadership election
 1928 New Zealand Liberal Party leadership election
 1930 New Zealand Liberal Party leadership election

United Kingdom
 1967 Liberal Party leadership election
 1976 Liberal Party leadership election

See also
 
 Liberal Democrats leadership election
 Liberal Democratic Party leadership election